FreuD euch is the seventh solo (and ninth overall) studio album by Nina Hagen. It was released in 1995 on Ariola. The record has the punk feel of her first album, with short, caustic guitar-driven tracks. The cover artwork includes three holographic designs amongst holographic flowers, which when tilted from right to left show Hagen spelling something.

Track listing 
All tracks composed by Nina Hagen; except where noted.
 "(Another Junkie) Einfach Nina" 1:20 
 "Lass Mich in Ruhe!" (Hagen, Dee Dee Ramone) 1:48 
 "Stacheldraht" 2:50 
 "Tiere" (Hagen, Ralf Goldkind) 3:27 
 "Zero Zero U.F.O." (German version) (Hagen, Dee Dee Ramone) 2:34 
 "Gloria Halleluja Amen" (Hagen, Ralf Goldkind) 1:45 
 "Geburt" (Hagen, Ralf Goldkind) 3:40 
 "Sonntag Morgen" (Lou Reed, John Cale) 3:27 
 "Abgehaun" (Hagen, Dee Dee Ramone) 3:41 
 "Freiheitslied" 3:19 
 "Wende" 1:59 
 "Kunst" 2:41 
 "Riesenschritt" (Carole King, Gerry Goffin) 3:04 
 "Sternmädchen" (Hagen, Dee Dee Ramone) 2:49 
 "Elefantengott Jai Ganesh" (Ralf Goldkind, Rai Das) 2:57

Note
The last song's length is indicated as 2:57 on the record's sleeve; in fact, "Elefantengott Jai Ganesh" lasts 5:03, and is followed by a 30 seconds silence and a cover of "Pank" (which already closed "Nina Hagen Band"), resulting in a 7:07 track.

Personnel
Nina Hagen – vocals
Chris Hughes – bass, guitar
Dee Dee Ramone – rhythm guitar (tracks 1, 2, 5, 9)
Ralf Goldkind – guitar, bass, keyboards, programming
Fred Thurley – guitar
David Nash – programming
Rai Das – noise
Andy Birr – percussion
Ash Wednesday - bass, programming

References
Nina Hagen – FreuD euch

1995 albums
Nina Hagen albums
Ariola Records albums